Brunswick Rally Badge, also known as the Badge of the SA Rally at Brunswick 1931 (Das Abzeichen vom SA - Treffen in Braunschweig 1931), was the third badge recognised as a national award of the Nazi Party (NSDAP). Through the regulations of 6 November 1936, a special Party Honour Badge commemorating the SA Assembly in Braunschweig on 17-18 October 1931 was created.

The rally 
The event itself was a joint rally of Sturmabteilung (SA) and Schutzstaffel (SS) men put on to show both strength in strife-weary Germany and loyalty to their leader, Adolf Hitler. This was before Hitler came to national power as Chancellor of Germany in January, 1933. A total of 104,000 SA and SS men participated in a six hour march in review before Hitler and the first inspection of the SA Motor and NSKK (National Socialist Motor Corps) units. The (Braunschweig) Brunswick rally was hosted by SA-Gruppe Nord under the leadership of then SA-Gruppenführer Viktor Lutze. At the rally, the SA assured Hitler of their loyalty and Hitler in turn increased the size of the SA with the creation of 24 new Standarten (regiment-sized formations). Several years later in 1934, Hitler rewarded Lutze's loyalty by appointing him the commander of the SA succeeding Ernst Röhm as Stabschef, after Röhm was murdered during the Night of the Long Knives.

The badge 
The badge was to commemorate the event that took place, and to honour the participants of the mass rally. To be able to obtain by purchase and wear the badge, the Party member had to have officially attended the rally. The badge could only be worn on the left breast side of a uniform. It was made in two types; Pattern 1: measured 37mm wide by 50mm high; it had the Party eagle at the top and an oak leaf wreath around the outside rim. At the bottom of the oak leaf wreath was a bow. Inside the wreath was inscribed, SA-Treffen Braunschweig 17./18. Oktober 1931. The second pattern measured 37mm wide by 52mm high but otherwise had the same basic design as the first pattern. Some early badges were stamped out of tin and were silver in colour. Later ones were stamped with a solid back and were grey in colour. The permission to wear the badge had to be confirmed by the Senior SA Party leader or above. The wearing of the badge could be revoked by SA-Stabschef Lutze or his successors.

In November 1936, Hitler gave new "orders" for the "Orders and Awards" of the Third Reich. The top NSDAP awards were listed in this order: 1. Coburg Badge; 2. Nuremberg (Nürnberg) Party Badge of 1929; 3. SA Rally Badge at Brunswick 1931; 4. Golden Party Badge; 5. Blood Order (Blutorden); followed by the Gau (territory) badges and the Golden Hitler Youth Badge.

Notes

References 

Orders, decorations, and medals of Nazi Germany